Mohanpur is a medium populated village in Begusarai District, India. It is situated on the banks of Burhi Gandak. The nearest sub-divisions are Manjhaul and Begusarai.

Mohanpur has one High School, one Middle School and two Primary schools. Economy is mainly agrarian. This village also boasts a hospital, bank and a public library.

Villages in Begusarai district